Kafar castle is a historical castle located in Garmsar County in Semnan Province, The longevity of this fortress dates back to the Middle Ages and Late Historical Periods of Islam.

References 

Castles in Iran